This is a list of books from the Goosebumps book series written by R. L. Stine and published by Scholastic. The first book, Welcome to Dead House, was published in July 1992. Numerous spin-off series were written by Stine, including Goosebumps Series 2000 (published from 1998 to 2000), Goosebumps Gold (which was never released), Give Yourself Goosebumps (1995 to 2000), Goosebumps HorrorLand (2008 to 2012) and Goosebumps Most Wanted (2012 to 2016). More than 400 million Goosebumps books have been sold, making it the best-selling series of all time for several years. At one point, Goosebumps sold 4 million books a month. A film based on the books was released on October 16, 2015.
A new book series called Goosebumps House of Shivers set after Slappyworld will start on September 2023.

Goosebumps (1992–1997)
 Some titles are now out-of-print, but most of the original series books (all but five: 24, 47, 60, 61 and 62) were reprinted by Scholastic between September 2003 and June 2007 in a new cover style. In addition, 22 books were reissued from May 2008 to November 2011 as part of the Classic Goosebumps series to accompany the Goosebumps HorrorLand series.

Tales to Give You Goosebumps (1994–1997)

Give Yourself Goosebumps (1995–2000)

Goosebumps Presents (1996–1998)
The books in the original Goosebumps series that were made into episodes of the Goosebumps television series were subsequently rereleased in a series called Goosebumps Presents. The main difference between the books in this series and their original publications is that the Goosebumps Presents editions contained photos from the corresponding episodes. 18 books were released from 1996 - 1998.

Goosebumps Haunted Library (1996)

Goosebumps Autobiographies (1997–1998)

Goosebumps Triple Header (1997–1998)

Goosebumps Series 2000 (1998–2000)

Goosebumps Gold (Unreleased)
Goosebumps Gold was the intended follow-up of Goosebumps Series 2000 but was cancelled before any book was published. One of two book series by R.L. Stine that were planned to be released some time in 2001 (the other being The Nightmare Room), these books appeared on series illustrator Tim Jacobus's website and marketing sites but unlike The Nightmare Room series, were never released. In this series, Stine intended to write a sequel to The Haunted Mask II (The Haunted Mask Lives!), a sequel to Welcome to Dead House (Happy Holidays from Dead House) and a sequel to Slappy's Nightmare (Slappy New Year!, a title later used for a Goosebumps HorrorLand book, though Stine has stated that the plot of the Gold and Horrorland books is completely different).

Goosebumps Graphix (2006–2015)
This series features artists' interpretations of select books into graphic novels. This series began when R.L Stine starting receiving letters from fans asking him to write more Goosebumps books.

Goosebumps HorrorLand (2008–2012)

Goosebumps Most Wanted (2012–2016)

Goosebumps movie adaptations (2015–2018)
These books were released as tie-ins to the Goosebumps film series.

Goosebumps SlappyWorld (2017–present)

Misc. Goosebumps books

Goosebumps Monster Editions (1995–1997)

References

External links

  at Scholastic Press

Goosebumps
Lists of children's books